

England

Head coach: Dick Greenwood

 Rob Andrew
 Phil Blakeway
 Steve Brain
 David Cooke
 Paul Dodge (c.)
 Wade Dooley
 Jon Hall
 Richard Harding
 Bob Hesford
 Richard Hill
 Chris Martin
 Nigel Melville
 John Orwin
 Gary Pearce
 Kevin Simms
 Simon Smith
 Mike Teague
 Rory Underwood

France

Head coach: Jacques Fouroux

 Serge Blanco
 Éric Bonneval
 Didier Codorniou
 Jean Condom
 Philippe Dintrans (c.)
 Pierre Dospital
 Dominique Erbani
 Patrick Estève
 Jerome Gallion
 Jean-Pierre Garuet-Lempirou
 Jacques Gratton
 Francis Haget
 Jean-Luc Joniel
 Bernard Lavigne
 Jean-Patrick Lescarboura
 Jean-Charles Orso
 Laurent Pardo
 Laurent Rodriguez
 Philippe Sella

Ireland

Head coach: Mick Doyle

 Willie Anderson
 Michael Bradley
 Nigel Carr
 Keith Crossan
 Paul Dean
 Ciaran Fitzgerald (c.)
 Mick Fitzpatrick
 Michael Kiernan
 Donal Lenihan
 Hugo MacNeill
 Philip Matthews
 Brian McCall
 J. J. McCoy
 Rory Moroney
 Brendan Mullin
 Phil Orr
 Trevor Ringland
 Brian Spillane

Scotland

Head coach: Derrick Grant

 Roger Baird
 John Beattie
 Jim Calder
 Alister Campbell
 Colin Deans
 Peter Dods
 Gordon Hunter
 John Jeffrey
 Roy Laidlaw (c.)*
 David Leslie (c.)**
 Gerry McGuinness
 Iain Milne
 Keith Murray
 Iain Paxton
 Jim Pollock
 Keith Robertson
 Norrie Rowan
 John Rutherford
 Tom Smith
 Peter Steven
 Alan Tomes
 Iwan Tukalo
 Douglas Wyllie

* captain in the first game
** captain in the other three games

Wales

Head coach: John Bevan

 Rob Ackerman
 Gareth Davies
 Jonathan Davies
 Phil Davies
 Ian Eidman
 Stuart Evan
 Adrian Hadley
 Terry Holmes (c.)
 Kevin Hopkins
 Billy James
 Phil Lewis
 Dick Moriarty
 Martyn Morris
 Bob Norster
 John Perkins
 Dai Pickering
 Mark Ring
 Gareth Roberts
 Paul Thorburn
 Mark Titley
 Jeff Whitefoot
 Mark Wyatt

External links
1985 Five Nations Championship Statistics

Six Nations Championship squads